Artificial Cells, Nanomedicine, and Biotechnology is a peer-reviewed scientific journal that publishes articles on the development of artificial cells, tissue engineering, artificial organs, blood substitutes, cell therapy, gene and drug delivery systems, bioencapsulation nanosensors, nanodevices, and other areas of biotechnology. It is published by Taylor & Francis and the editors-in-chief are R.D.K. Misra (University of Texas at El Paso) and Wojciech Chrzanowski (University of Sydney).

References

External links

Publications established in 1973
Biochemistry journals
Biotechnology journals
8 times per year journals
Taylor & Francis academic journals